The Gass was a rock band formed in May 1965 by Robert Tench, Godfrey McLean, and Errol McLean. They were managed by Rik Gunnell and Active Management. The band fused melodies with soul, Latin influences, blues and progressive rock often employing complex rhythms with an eclectic mix of other influences.

History

1965-1969 
Formed in 1965 original line up was Bobby Tench on bass guitar (credited as Robert Tench), percussionist Errol McLean, his brother drummer and vocalist Godfrey McLean, saxophonist Humphrey Oka and guitarist Alan Roskams. Tench soon became the band's vocalist and lead guitarist and between 1965 and 1967 they released singles on the Parlophone and CBS labels and as their music progressed the line up changed. They also played at clubs and venues in U.K and at fashionable music venues in London's Soho such as The Ad Lib club, The Flamingo and the Bag O'Nails. Eric Burdon sang with them at The Scotch of St James where they were employed as the house band and Jimi Hendrix jammed with them. During 1968 they were supporting bands such as Led Zeppelin. In 1969 they became the band for the rock musical Catch My Soul-Rock Othello produced by Jack Good and their participation was billed as 'music interpreted by Gass'.

1970-1971 
By this period the band were known simply as Gass and they released their first album Juju (1970) which featured guitarist Peter Green. In the same year Godfrey McLean appeared on Peter Green's End of the Game (1970). Gass were also featured on the album Catch My Soul (1971), which was recorded with the original cast of the UK stage production of Catch My Soul-Rock Othello.

In 1971 the band recorded the single "Something's Got To Change Your Ways" which was released the Polydor label. Pete Masden mentions in his book Funk guitar and Bass, that during this period Godfrey McLean and Tench performed at regular jam sessions with other musicians at Ronnie Scott's club. These sessions led to an embryonic line up for the fusion band Gonzalez.

Post disbanding 
In May 1971 Tench joined The Jeff Beck Group and Gass finally disbanded. Godfrey McLean recorded with Brian Auger and The Oblivion Express. Delisle Harper who was the band's bass player in a later lineup appeared with Tench on Freddie King's Burglar (1974) also Larger than Life (1975). and Roskams moved on to work with Herbie Goins

Band members
1969-1971
 Robert Tench-bass, guitar, organ and vocals
 Godfrey McLean-drums, congas, vocals and percussion
 Delisle Harper-bass and percussion
 Derek Austin-organ, piano, flute and percussion
 Michael Piggott-violin and guitar

1965-1969
 Robert Tench-bass, guitar, organ and vocals
 Godfrey McLean-drums, congas, vocals and percussion
 Alan Roskams-lead guitar (left in 1967) 
 Stuart Cowell-lead guitar (left in 1967)
 Frank Clark-Organ
 Humphrey Okan-Saxophone
 Errol McLean-Congas

Discography 
Albums
Supergroups Vol. 2 (1970) (track 1: "Black Velvet" featuring Peter Green).
Juju featuring Peter Green Polydor 2485 003 (1970). Re-released as Gass in the same year with the same personnel, track listing and catalogue number.
Catch My Soul Polydor 2383 035 (1971)

Singles
as The Gass
 "One Of These Days"/"I Don't Know Why" Parlophone R 5344 (1965) 
 "The New Breed"/"In The City" Parlophone R 5456 (1966)
 "Dream Baby (How Long Must I Dream)"/"Jitterbug Sid" CBS 2647 (1967)
 "Something's Got To Change Your Ways"/"Mr. Banana" Polydor 2058 147 (1971)

Notes

References 
Celmins, Martin. Peter Green Founder of Fleetwood Mac, foreword by BB King. Sanctuary Publishing, (1998) 2nd edition. 
Hjort, Chris and Hinman, Doug. Jeff's book : A Chronology of Jeff Beck's Career 1965-1980 : from the Yardbirds to Jazz-Rock. Rock 'n' Roll Research Press, (2000). 
Joynson, Vernon. The Tapestry of Delights - The Comprehensive Guide to British Music of the Beat, R&B, Psychedelic and Progressive Eras 1963-1976. Borderline (2006). Reprinted (2008). 
Larkin, Colin. The Guinness Encyclopedia of Popular Music. Guinness (1992). Item notes: v.2. Digitized (19 Jun 2007). 
Madsen, Pete. Funk Guitar and Bass: Know the Players, Play the Music. Backbeat (2007).

External links 
Jack Good
New Vitality on London Management Scene. Billboard 13 November 1971
Nathaniel Ab Lib Club: It happened here. Time Out

British rock music groups
Musical groups established in 1965
British funk musical groups
British soul musical groups
Musical groups disestablished in 1971